Darcelle XV (born November 16, 1930) is the stage name of Walter W. Cole, a drag queen, entertainer and cabaret owner and operator in Portland, Oregon, United States. Guinness World Records has certified him as the oldest drag queen performer, with a career as an entertainer spanning 55 years as of 2021.

Biography
Cole was born in 1930 and raised in the Linnton neighborhood. He was described as a shy, "four-eyed sissy boy". He served in the United States Armed Forces, and was discharged after the Korean War in the late 1950s, after which he lived a "conventional" life in southeast Portland with his wife and two children. He worked at a Fred Meyer store and described himself as having "a crew cut and horn-rimmed glasses". Military funds helped him start business ventures.  
 
Cole first purchased a coffeehouse called Caffé Espresso, which later relocated and expanded to include a basement jazz club called Studio A. In 1967, he purchased a tavern in northwest Portland which became Darcelle XV Showplace.

Cole first wore a woman's dress at age 37. By 1969, he had developed the alter ego Darcelle and came out as gay. He left his wife and began a relationship with Roxy Neuhardt who worked alongside Darcelle at the Showplace as a choreographer, show director, performer, bookkeeper, office manager and payroll accountant. The two remained together until Neuhardt's death in 2017.

Darcelle

Cole, who had an interest in acting and had worked at Portland Civic Theater, developed his alter ego Darcelle and came out as gay. The name "Darcelle" honors French actress and singer Denise Darcel.

Darcelle wore false eyelashes, jewelry, and shiny clothing. Cole described Darcelle's persona as "sequins on the eyelids, lots of feathers, big hair, big jewels, and lots of wisecracks". Avoiding an Oregon law that prohibited the use of more than one instrument during performances, entertainers at Darcelle XV Showplace lip-synched. The business was fined after Neuhardt performed a "ballet-like adagio" with another man.

Darcelle attends social functions throughout the city. In 2011, he served as grand marshal of the Portland Rose Festival's Starlight Parade and received the city's Spirit of Portland Award. Cole and Sharon Knorr published his memoir, Just Call Me Darcelle, in 2011. The book recalls Cole's life, including his childhood, military service, and being Darcelle.

In 2021 a documentary called Maisie was released. This featured English drag artiste David Raven who works under the name of Maisie Trollette. He is the oldest UK drag artiste still working, turning 85 in 2021. At Legends in Brighton, Maisie met Darcelle after Raven had earlier met him at the Brighton Hotel.

Reception
Darcelle XV Showplace has hosted the longest-running drag show on the West Coast. In Kelly Clarke's review of Cole's memoir, she described him as "an energetic businessman whose desire for a life less ordinary catapulted him from a job at Fred Meyer to become the proprietor of a counterculture coffee shop, an after-hours jazz club, a rough-'n'-ready 'dyke bar' and, finally, a nationally known drag revue, without ever leaving Portland."

Darcelle XV was recognized by Guinness World Records as the world's oldest drag queen in 2016, then aged 85 years and 273 days.

See also
 La Femme Magnifique International Pageant
 Michelle DuBarry
 List of drag queens

References

External links

 
 http://www.opb.org/television/programs/oregonexperience/segment/darcelle-xv/ 

1930 births
Living people
20th-century American male actors
21st-century American male actors
American drag queens
American LGBT military personnel
American male stage actors
American military personnel of the Korean War
Gay military personnel
American gay actors
American gay writers
LGBT people from Oregon
Male actors from Portland, Oregon
Writers from Portland, Oregon
21st-century American LGBT people
20th-century American LGBT people